When Knighthood Was in Flower is the debut novel of American author Charles Major written under the pseudonym, Edwin Caskoden. It was first published by The Bobbs-Merrill Company (then the Bowen-Merrill Company) in 1898 and proved an enormous success.

According to the New York Times, in its third year on the market the book was still selling so well that it was #9 on the list of bestselling novels in the United States for 1900.

The book spawned an entire industry of historical romantic novels and films.

In 1901, playwright Paul Kester wrote the Broadway play and by 1907 When Knighthood Was in Flower was still being printed by the reprint publisher, Grosset & Dunlap, when the film rights were sold to Biograph Studios.

It was sometimes known by the title When Knights Were Bold and should not be confused with the 1906 play When Knights Were Bold which also inspired several film adaptations.

Plot summary

Set during the Tudor period of English history, When Knighthood Was in Flower tells the tribulations of Mary Tudor, a younger sister of Henry VIII of England who has fallen in love with a commoner. However, for political reasons, King Henry has arranged for her to wed King Louis XII of France and demands his sister put the House of Tudor first, threatening, "You will marry France and I will give you a wedding present – Charles Brandon's head!"

Adaptations

1908 adaptation

Although no film copy of the film exists, the book is believed to have been adapted to a 1908 motion picture of the same name or under the title When Knights Were Bold  by D. W. Griffith and directed by Wallace McCutcheon.

1922 adaptation
The 1922 version is most remembered as the vehicle for Marion Davies financed by William Randolph Hearst and his company Cosmopolitan Productions. Directed by Robert Vignola and starring Hearst's mistress Marion Davies and Forrest Stanley, it was a big-budget silent film.

1953 adaptation
In 1953, Major's book was remade by Walt Disney with the title The Sword and the Rose in the United States, but released with the original title in the United Kingdom. This version was adapted for the screen by American Lawrence Edward Watkin, but was filmed in the United Kingdom. Directed by Ken Annakin with a British and French cast, it starred Richard Todd and Glynis Johns. In 1955, the film was broadcast on the Disneyland television show in two parts under the original book title When Knighthood Was in Flower.

See also
Cultural depictions of Henry VIII of England

External links

 

1898 American novels
Works published under a pseudonym
Novels set in the 16th century
American novels adapted into films
American novels adapted into plays
1898 debut novels
Bobbs-Merrill Company books